Mordellistena geronensis is a beetle in the genus Mordellistena of the family Mordellidae. It was described in 1977 by Ermisch.

References

geronensis
Beetles described in 1977